The Fiat Bravo and Fiat Brava (Type 182) are small family cars produced by the Italian automaker Fiat from 1995 to 2003 (2001 in Europe). They were effectively two versions of the same car: the Bravo, a three-door hatchback, and the Brava, a five-door fastback. The Bravo name was revived in January 2007, with the all-new Fiat Bravo, a replacement for the Stilo. The new version was available only with five doors. 

The name Brava was also used in the United States in the 1980s, on the earlier Fiat 131.

History

The Bravo and the Brava were replacements for Fiat's successful but ageing Tipo model. The two cars were very different in styling detail and driving experience, the Bravo chassis being tuned for more precise handling, whilst the Brava was tuned for better comfort. The interior trim and many of the body colours were unique to either one version or the other. Both cars had a two-star safety rating on Euro NCAP. The cars came with all-new engines, the base model using a 1.4 L 12-valve engine producing .

Two turbodiesel engines were also available: both were 1.9 L four-cylinder units, one producing  and the other making . The Bravo/Brava was voted European Car of the Year on its launch.

The Bravo/Brava chassis spawned saloon and estate versions in 1996, which were badged as the Fiat Marea, a car which aimed at Ford Mondeo and Opel/Vauxhall Vectra buyers, which won praise for its large boot. 

Another car based on the Bravo/Brava underpinnings, the Fiat Multipla, was launched in 1999. This was a six-seater compact MPV. In the same year, the Bravo/Brava received a mild makeover. It was discontinued in 2001, being replaced by the Fiat Stilo.

The cars were advertised as being silent, futuristic, economical and offering "The Choice". Fiat's Italian adverts said "Fiat Bravo. Fiat Brava. La Scelta", which roughly translates as "Fiat Bravo. Fiat Brava. The Choice", hinting at the fact that they 'were very similar cars but with the option of a sporty three-door hatchback or a practical five-door fastback.

Peter Davis, Fiat's Styling Center director at the time, said that they started working on the Bravo and Brava immediately after they had finished working on the Coupe and the Barchetta. He said they wanted to push the design to the limit, break the rules and discover every angle of the car, distinguishing it from the competitors.

Jeremy Clarkson reviewed the Fiat Bravo and Brava in 1995 on Top Gear, stating that "This is how an ordinary car can look like, if you put a bit of effort into it". He also stated : "I'm in a three-door hatchback, which you can buy for less than £10,000, and I'm having fun, and it's only got a 1.4-litre engine! A good-looking car that's nice to drive and cheap to run too." Clarkson also said that the car felt rigid, there were no squeaks or rattles, and all the switches inside had a quality feel.

Makeover
The Bravo/Brava received a mild makeover in 1999. 

The 1.9 turbodiesel was phased out in favour of 1.9 JTD diesel units (now with and ), to give even better economy and refinement. In the Greek market, all later model Bravas received the rear deck spoiler as standard.

Special editions

 Anniversaire: introduced in 1997 for both cars, with only 1,100 pieces, celebrating Fiat's win of Car of the Year 1996 for the Bravo/Brava duo, for the market in Western Europe. It was a 1.6 16v Sx version, with metallic paint, electrically adjustable and heated mirrors, fog lights, front passenger airbag, ABS and a CD player instead of the Tape player.

 Evening Vale: introduced in March 2000 for the Brava for the Western Europe market. It was a 1.2 16V/1.6 16V/1.9 JTD SX version, with special 14" wheel trims and automatic A/C.

 Formula: introduced in 2001, for the Bravo, for the United Kingdom. It was a 1.2 16V SX version with the GT Trim's 15" wheels, GT's rear spoiler, electrically adjustable and heated mirrors, fog lights, CD Player and remote central locking.

 Limited Edition: onwards from 2000, for the Hungarian market. Available for the 1.2 16V and 1.6 16V versions, it featured metallic paint, electrically adjustable and heated mirrors, fog lights, a passenger airbag and automatic A/C. The 1.6 16V also featured ABS.

 Special Edition: limited Edition, but only for the Bravo.

 Steel: last Bravo/Brava models, a "farewell" of October 2001, for the market of Western European, before the duo was discontinued. Offered in 1.2 16v, 1.6 16v and 1.9 JTD Sx models, it featured Metallic Gray/Black/Blue paint, GT's 15" alloy wheels (Bravo) or Special 14" Wheel Trims (Brava), GT's rear spoiler, darkened rear lights (Bravo), "Steel" logo in the C column, electrically adjustable and heated mirrors, fog lights, passenger airbag, automatic A/C, CD Player, GT's steering wheel and shift knob wrapped in leather, two tone black/blue seats, white GT cluster and silver gt console and dash trim.

 Suite: available only for the 1.6/1.8/1.9 JTD Bravo GT for the Swiss market, in Blue or Black metallic colours, featuring special seven spoke 15" alloy wheels, the GT's rear spoiler, Suite logo in the C Column, front passenger airbag, side airbags, electrically adjustable and heated mirrors, fog lights, automatic A/C, remote central locking, a high quality four speaker CD player with a CD Changer, GT leather wrapped steering wheel and shift knob, silver center console and dash trim and a full leather interior in cream, dark brown, dark blue or black. 

 Trofeo: available only for the 1.2 Bravo Sx, for Western European markets, for 2000. Similar to the "Formula", it featured metallic Gray/Blue/Black/Sprint Blue/Sky Blue paint, GT's 15" alloy wheels painted with special gray paint, GT's rear spoiler, Trofeo written on the front wings, electrically adjustable and heated mirrors, fog lights, automatic A/C, GT's leather shift knob and steering wheel, white GT's cluster, silver center console and dash trim, blue/black two tone seats and door trim.

 Yellow: Hungarian 1.2 16v Sx Bravo, featuring the GT's alloy wheels, electrically adjustable and heated mirrors, fog lights and only available in a distinct yellow.

HGT Abarth
In the end of 1999, Fiat introduced the Abarth accessories for the Bravo, available were more aggressive wheels and bodykit, performance was the same as the 2.0 HGT model. It was produced from 2000 to 2002.

Engines

Brazil
The Brava was produced until 2003 in Brazil for the home market and export, but in the former, the engines available were:

 Brava Sx/Elx 1.6 16v 
 Brava HGT 1.8 16v ( or )

References

External links

Bravo Brava
Compact cars
Euro NCAP small family cars
2000s cars
Cars introduced in 1995
Hot hatches
Cars of Turkey
Front-wheel-drive vehicles
Cars of Brazil